Ammatho cuneonotatus, the footman moth, is a moth of the subfamily Arctiinae. The species was first described by Francis Walker in 1855. It is found in Cambodia, China, Nepal, Thailand, Peninsular Malaysia and Sumatra.

References

Moths of Asia
Moths described in 1855